The 19th European Athletics Junior Championships were held between 19 and 22 July 2007 at the FBK-Stadium in Hengelo, in the eastern Netherlands.

Medal summary

Men

Women

Medal table

See also 
2007 in athletics (track and field)

References 
Results

European Athletics U20 Championships
European Junior Championships
European Junior
European Junior
2007 in youth sport
Sports competitions in Overijssel
Sport in Hengelo